Haeundae LCT The Sharp is a major urban development project in Jung-dong, Haeundae District, Busan, South Korea. Located in front of Haeundae Beach, it consists of a 411.6 m, 101-floor supertall landmark tower and two 85-floor tall residential skyscrapers. It has an urban entertainment complex at the base housing a shopping mall, a hot spring spa and a water park. The landmark tower will house luxury and residential hotels with a convention center and an observatory.

As of July 8, 2018, 101-storey Land mark tower 90s floor level and twin 85-storey residential towers at 80s level structures completion. Busan's 2nd-4th mega tall Skyscraper after first 301m Haeundae Doosan We've the Zenith. LCT tower is the second tallest tower in South Korea after 555m Lotte World Tower in Seoul and comes under the World's top 10 most expensive skyscrapers. 

Construction was planned for 2007 and groundbreaking was held on October 28, 2013 and completion is scheduled for 2019. It was voted to have the second nicest toilet in South Korea.

Haeundae LCT The Sharp was completed and opened on 30 November 2019. Haeundae LCT The Sharp hosted the 2022 BTS Exhibition: "Proof" which is the anthology album of the Koren pop boy band BTS documenting the act's nine-year career. The Exhibition was planned by the band's entertainment agency, HYBE which invited fans to immerse themselves in a visual trail of BTS' history.

Gallery

See also 
 List of tallest buildings in Busan

References

Buildings and structures in Busan
Residential skyscrapers in South Korea
Skyscraper hotels in South Korea
Skidmore, Owings & Merrill buildings
Residential buildings completed in 2019
2019 establishments in South Korea
Haeundae District